Avraham "Avi" Ben-Chimol (born May 22, 1985) is an Israeli professional basketball player for Maccabi Haifa of the Israeli Premier League. He was the Israeli Premier League Assists Leader in 2018 and 2019.

Early years
Ben-Chimol was born in Kfar Saba, Israel, he played for Maccabi Tel Aviv youth team, he also played for Ironi Tet high-school team and led them to win the state championship in 2003.

Professional career
Ben-Chimol started his professional career with Maccabi Tel Aviv. In his first season with Maccabi, he won the Israeli League, Israeli Cup and Euroleague titles. On May 1, 2004, Ben-Chimol recorded 2 points and 1 assist in the EuroLeague Final match against Skipper Bologna.

On August 6, 2009, Ben-Chimol signed with Maccabi Rishon LeZion for the 2009–10 season. 

On June 17, 2010, Ben-Chimol signed a two-year deal with Maccabi Haifa. 

On July 31, 2013, Ben-Chimol signed a two-year deal with Bnei Herzliya. 

On October 14, 2014, Ben-Chimol signed with Maccabi Ashdod for the 2014–15 season. 

On July 24, 2015, Ben-Chimol returned to Maccabi Rishon LeZion for a second stint, signing a two-year deal. That season, he helped Rishon LeZion to win the 2016 Israeli League Championship.

On October 23, 2016, Ben-Chimol signed a one-year contract extension with Maccabi Rishon LeZion. In his fourth season with Rishon LeZion, Ben-Chimol participated in the Israeli League All-Star Game. He finished the season as the Israeli League Assists Leader by averaging 7.2 per game.

On July 9, 2018, Ben-Chimol returned to Hapoel Eilat for a second stint, signing a two-year deal. He was again the  Israeli Premier League Assists Leader in 2019. He averaged 7.2 points and 5.7 assists per game during the 2019-20 season. 

On August 19, 2020, Ben-Chimol signed one-year deal with Maccabi Haifa.

Israel national team
Ben-Chimol is a member of the Israel national basketball team. On November 24, 2017, He made his first appearance for the senior team at the 2019 FIBA Basketball World Cup qualification in a match against Estonia.

Ben-Chimol was a member of the Israeli National Under-20 team.  he helped the team to reach the 2004 FIBA Europe Under-20 Finals, where they eventually lost to Slovenia.

References

External links
 RealGM.com profile
 Basket.co.il profile

1985 births
Living people
Hapoel Eilat basketball players
Hapoel Gilboa Galil Elyon players
Ironi Ramat Gan players
Israeli Basketball Premier League players
Israeli men's basketball players
Maccabi Ashdod B.C. players
Maccabi Haifa B.C. players
Maccabi Rishon LeZion basketball players
Maccabi Tel Aviv B.C. players
People from Kfar Saba
Point guards